Gianpiero Cordovani (25 May 1938 - 2017) was an Italian high jumper.

Career
Three-time national champion at senior level in high jump from 1957 to 1959, boasts 8 caps in the Italy national athletics team.

National titles
Cordovani won three national championships in a row at individual senior level.

Italian Athletics Championships
High jump: 1957, 1958, 1959

References

1938 births
2017 deaths
Italian male high jumpers
Athletics competitors of Fiamme Oro
20th-century Italian people
21st-century Italian people